Ottavio Tiby (1891-1955) Italian ethnomusicologist, was one of the pioneers of the scholarly study of Sicilian folk music.

External links
 

Italian folk musicians
1891 births
1955 deaths
20th-century Italian musicians
20th-century Italian musicologists